or  is the most prestigious art school in Japan. Located in Ueno Park, it also has facilities in Toride, Ibaraki, Yokohama, Kanagawa, and Kitasenju and Adachi, Tokyo. The university has trained renowned artists in the fields of painting, sculpture, crafts, inter-media, sound, music composition, traditional instruments, art curation and global arts.

History
The former Tokyo Fine Arts School was then restructured as the Faculty of Fine Arts under the university.

Originally male-only, the school began to admit women in 1946. The graduate school opened in 1963, and began offering doctoral degrees in 1977. The doctoral degree in fine art practice initiated in the 1980s was one of the earliest programs to do so globally. On April 1, 2008, the university changed its English name from "Tokyo National University of Fine Arts and Music" to "Tokyo University of the Arts."

The school has had student exchanges with a number of other art and music institutions such as École des Beaux-Arts (France), School of the Art Institute of Chicago (USA), the Royal Academy of Music (UK), the University of Sydney and Queensland College of Art, Griffith University (Australia), the Korea National University of Arts, and the China Central Academy of Fine Arts.

Departments

Department of Fine Arts
(Includes undergraduate and graduate school programs)
Japanese Painting
Oil Painting
Sculpture
Craft
Design
Architecture and Planning
Aesthetics and Art History
Inter-media Arts
Conservation

Department of Music

(Includes undergraduate and graduate school programs)
Composition
Conducting
Vocal Music
Piano
Organ
String instruments
Wind and Percussion Instruments
Early Music
Musicology
Traditional Japanese Music
Musical Creativity and the Environment

Graduate School of Film and New Media
(Only for graduate students)
Film production
New media
Animation

Graduate School of Global Arts 
 Arts Studies and Curatorial Practices

Organization
 University Art Museum
 University Library
 University Orchestra
 University Opera
Administration Office
Art Media Center
Center for Music Research
Geidai Art Plaza
Health Care Service Center
Institute of Ancient Art Research
Oversea Student Center
Photography Center
Performing Arts Center
Senior High School of Music
Sogakudo Concert Hall
Training Center for Foreign Language and Diction

Contact information
Tokyo University of the Arts12-8 Ueno ParkTaitō, Tokyo 110-8714, Japan

Alumni

Artists

Erina Matsui (painter)
Aiko Miyanaga (sculptor)
Firoz Mahmud (Bangladeshi contemporary Artist / painter)
Eric Van Hove (Belgian artist)
Takashi Murakami (artist)
Yoshitoshi Abe (cartoonist / illustrator)
Cóilín Ó Dubhghaill (metalworker and irogane researcher)
Shin Egashira (Architect/ Sculptor)
Tsuguharu Foujita (oil painter / sculptor)
Shigeo Fukuda (graphic designer)
Jin Goto (artist / painter - Nihonga painting)
Fuyuko Matsui (painter)
Kaii Higashiyama (painter)
Ikuo Hirayama (painter)
Shunsō Hishida (painter)
Eiko Ishioka (designer)
Mari Katayama (textile artist and photographer)
Tōichi Katō (painter)
Gyokudo Kawai (painter)
Kim Su-keun (architect)
Kim Yong-jun (art critic)
Ryōhei Koiso (oil painter)
Yōichi Kotabe (animator)
Seiji Kurata (photographer)
Tetsuya Noda (artist)
Kakuzō Okakura (essayist)
Tarō Okamoto (artist)
Carl Randall (painter)
Lee Shih-chiao (painter)
Kanzan Shimomura (painter)
Yasushi Sugiyama (painter)
Shinzaburo Takeda (printmaker / painter)
Masao Tamiya (graphic artist)
Tadao Tominari (photographer)
Kōtarō Takamura (sculptor / poet)
Hiroshi Teshigahara (film director)
Eisaku Wada (painter / faculty)
Yoshihiko Wada (oil painter)
Tsubasa Yamaguchi (manga artist)
Iwao Yamawaki (photographer / architect)
Ryumon Yasuda (painter / sculptor)
Taikan Yokoyama (painter)
Yassan (GPS drawing)
Yukihiko Yasuda (painter)
Yorozu Tetsugoro (painter)

Musicians

Yasushi Akutagawa (composer)
Ikuma Dan (composer)
Ichiro Fujiyama (singer / composer)
Akiko Futaba (singer)
Mihoko Fujimura (operatic mezzo-soprano))
Kunihiko Hashimoto (composer)
Shiro Hamaguchi (composer / arranger)
Masashi Hamauzu (composer)
Hikaru Hayashi (composer)
Ryohei Hirose (composer)
Shin-ichiro Ikebe (composer)
Hiroyuki Iwaki (conductor)
Taku Iwasaki (composer)
Hiroshi Kajiwara (pianist)
Kaoru Kakudo (violinist)
Ken'ichiro Kobayashi (conductor)
Jo Kondo (composer)
Hayato Matsuo (composer)
Toshiro Mayuzumi (composer)
Minoru Miki (composer)
Hajime Mizoguchi (composer)
Makoto Moroi (composer)
Kōtarō Nakagawa (composer / arranger)
Akira Nishimura (composer)
Shigeaki Saegusa (composer)
Toshihiko Sahashi (composer)
Ryuichi Sakamoto (composer)
Kazue Sawai (koto player)
Tadao Sawai (koto player and composer)
Tatsuo Sasaki (Timpani/marimba player)
Makoto Shinohara (composer)
Masaaki Suzuki (organist / harpsichordist / conductor)
Motoaki Takenouchi (composer)
Yuzo Toyama (composer / conductor)
Rentarō Taki (composer)
Chiyuki Urano (baritone)
Kosaku Yamada (composer / conductor)
Kazuo Yamada (conductor)
Akio Yashiro (composer)
Akeo Watanabe (conductor)
Diramore (composer / music director)

Others
 Kenji Ekuan (industrial designer)
Eiji Aonuma (video game designer)
Li Zuixiong (conservation scientist)
Norio Ohga (former president of Sony / singer / conductor)
Rin' (pop group)

Faculty members

Masaki Fujihata (new media)
 (inter-media arts)
Osamu Kido (sculpture)
Atsushi Kitagawara (architecture)
Takeshi Kitano (film)
Ken-Ichiro Kobayashi (conducting)
Kiyoshi Kurosawa (film)
Toyomichi Kurita (film)
Joun Ōshima (sculpture), noted Japanese sculptor in the Meiji/Taisho/Showa periods
Meio Saitō (oil painting)
Tokihiro Satō (inter-media arts)
Michael W. Schneider (printmaking)
Takashi Shimizu (violin)
Kanzan Shimomura
Masaaki Suzuki (early music)
Ritsuko Taho (inter-media arts)
Toru Takahashi (education)
Kōun Takamura
Kenji Watanabe (piano)
Yoshiaki Watanabe (inter-media arts)
Koji Yamamoto (industrial arts)

See also
 List of National Treasures of Japan (ancient documents)

References

External links

 

 
1949 establishments in Japan
Educational institutions established in 1949
Taitō
Universities and colleges in Yokohama
Universities and colleges in Ibaraki Prefecture
Japanese national universities
Universities and colleges in Tokyo